The Royal Spanish Olympic Shooting Federation, Spanish Real Federación Española de Tiro Olímpico (RFETO), organizes all shooting sports in Spain and is amongst other a member of the International Practical Shooting Confederation (IPSC), the International Shooting Sport Federation (ISSF) and the European Shooting Confederation (ESC).

Shooting disciplines 
 Pistol
 Rifle
 Shotgun
 Practical
 Muzzleloading
 Benchrest shooting
 Fullbore target rifle

National championships 
 The IPSC Spanish Handgun Championships

See also 
 List of shooting sports organizations

Other umbrella organizations for shooting 
 Association of Maltese Arms Collectors and Shooters
 French Shooting Federation
 Finnish Shooting Sport Federation
 Hellenic Shooting Federation
 Monaco Shooting Federation
 Norwegian Shooting Association
 Swiss Shooting Sport Federation

References

External links 
 Official website

Regions of the International Practical Shooting Confederation
Shooting
National members of the European Shooting Confederation
Regions of the International Confederation of Fullbore Rifle Associations